Social Justice Party may refer to one of the following parties:

 Social Justice Party (Egypt)
 Social Justice Party (Nagorno Karabakh)
Social Justice Party (Somalia)
 Social Justice Party (Thailand)
 Social Justice (political party) in Israel
 Party of Social Justice in Russia